Saryan or Sarian (Western Armenian Սարեան) is an Armenian surname. Notable people with the surname include:

Armenian surname

Saryan
 Ghazaros Saryan or Lazar Saryan (1920–1998), Armenian composer
 Gegham Saryan (1902–1976), Armenian poet and translator
 Martiros Saryan (1880–1972), Armenian painter

Sarian
 Araksi Sarian-Harutunian (1937–2013), Armenian musicologist
 Bailey Sarian, American YouTuber
 Liz Sarian, French Armenian singer

Others
 Kim Saryan or Kim Sa-ryang (1914–1950), Japanese and Korean author

See also
 Saryān, romanized form of Sereyan, a village in Iran
 Sarian (disambiguation)
 Sereyan

Armenian-language surnames